This is a list of lightships of the United States, listing lightships operated by the United States government. The first US lightship was put in place off of Willoughby Spit in Chesapeake Bay, Virginia, in 1820. Lightships remained in service in the United States until March 29, 1985, when the last ship, the Nantucket I, was decommissioned. During that period, lightships were operated by several branches of the government: by the Lighthouse Establishment from 1820 to 1852, the Lighthouse Board from 1852 to 1910, the Lighthouse Service from 1910 to 1939, and the Coast Guard from 1939 to 1985.

The naming conventions used for lightships are not consistent. Until 1867, there was no uniform method to refer to individual lightships. Lightships in that period generally took the name of the station that they served, but occasionally other names. These names were not permanently assigned to an individual vessel. Rather, whenever a lightship was moved to a new station she took on that name. That made identifying individual ships nearly impossible. Beginning in 1867, lightship numbers (hull numbers) were assigned to ships still in service. These numbers are the primary means of identifying individual lightships across her various stations. In 1938, the Lighthouse Service retroactively allocated letter codes to the unnumbered lightships based on their research of available records, although some ships may have been lost or misidentified. Even with the hull numbers, it is common to refer to a lightship by the name of the station it serves (or Relief, if it is a relief ship) and a few, such as the Nantucket I and Nantucket II have been given individual names.

Lightships

Notes

 ^ A. Name assigned retroactively in 1938. During her years in service, this ship was referred to exclusively by her station name.
 ^ B. Name/hull number assigned between 1867–70. Previously, she was referred to exclusively by her station name. 
 ^ C. LV-12 was assigned to two ships. From circa 1867 to 1871, LV-12 was the former Guthrie and LV-22 was an unnamed Fifth District relief vessel. In 1871, old LV-12 was decommissioned and LV-22 was renumbered LV-12. For clarity, this list refers to her as LV-22 exclusively.
 ^ D. Name/hull number assigned between 1867–68 in anticipation of her return to service, but she was found not fit, condemned, and sold.
 ^ E. Either LV-37 or LV-38 was the first lightship to have launched with a LV designation. Except for the anomalously numbered LV-10 (which would have been 43), all subsequent US lightships were numbered sequentially.
 ^ F. Six identical vessels: LV 100/WAL 523 (1929), LV 113/WAL 535 (1929) and LV 114 / WAL 536 (1930) built at Albina Iron Works, Portland, Oregon. LV 115 / WAL 537 (1930), LV 116 / WAL 538 (1930) and LV 117 (1930) built at Charleston Drydock & Machine Company, Charleston, South Carolina.

References

Further reading
 

 
Ships of the United States Lighthouse Service